Josep Fontserè i Mestre (1829 - 15 May 1897) was a Spanish Catalan architect.

1829 births
1897 deaths
People from Barcelona
Architects from Catalonia
19th-century Spanish architects